Afantou is a village and a former municipality on the island of Rhodes, in the Dodecanese, Greece. Since the 2011 local government reform it is part of the municipality Rhodes, of which it is a municipal unit. It is situated on the east coast of Rhodes just south of the resort town Faliraki. From a total population of 6,911 (2011 census) 6,072 reside in Afantou town. The only other settlements are the village of Archipoli (pop. 582) and the resort Kolympia (257).

The municipal unit also hosts the only golf course of the island, the Afantou-Golf, which is next to one of the longest beaches on the island. The municipal unit has a land area of 46.100 km². In 1996, the Music School of Rhodes (Greece) was transferred from Therme to Afantou due to housing problems for the school whilst it was situated in Therme.

References

Populated places in Rhodes